Amphipoea crinanensis, the Crinan ear, is a moth of the family Noctuidae. The species was first described by Charles Richard Nelson Burrows in 1908. It is found in Fennoscandia, Ireland, Great Britain, Denmark, Germany, the Baltic region and central Russia.

The wingspan is 30–33 mm. The ground colour of the forewings ranges from burnt sienna through to reddish brown. The colour ranges from burnt sienna through to reddish brown. The reniform stigma is yellow or orange or occasionally white. The orbicular stigma obscure. The crosslines are darker than the ground colour. The hindwings are brownish ochreous and have a small discal spot.

Adults are on wing from August to September.

The larvae are thought to feed inside the stems of Iris pseudacorus.

Similar species
Requiring genitalic examination to separate. See Townsend et al.,
 Amphipoea lucens
 Amphipoea fucosa
 Amphipoea oculea

References

External links
Fauna Europaea

Acronictinae
Moths described in 1908
Moths of Europe